List of champions of the 1890 U.S. National Championships (now known as the US Open). The men's singles and doubles competitions were held from 18 August to 27 August on the outdoor grass courts at the Newport Casino in Newport, Rhode Island. The women's singles and doubles competitions were held from 10 June to 13 June on the outdoor grass courts at the Philadelphia Cricket Club in Philadelphia, Pennsylvania. It was the 10th U.S. National Championships and the second Grand Slam tournament of the year.

Finals

Men's singles
 
 Oliver Campbell defeated  Henry Slocum 6–2, 4–6, 6–3, 6–1

Women's singles
 
 Ellen Roosevelt defeated  Bertha Townsend  6–2, 6–2

Men's doubles
 Valentine Hall /  Clarence Hobart defeated  Charles Carver /  John Ryerson 6–3, 4–6, 6–2, 2–6, 6–3

Women's doubles
 Grace Roosevelt /  Ellen Roosevelt defeated  Bertha Townsend /  Margarette Ballard 6–1, 6–2

References

External links
Official US Open website

 
U.S. National Championships
U.S. National Championships (tennis) by year
U.S. National Championships (tennis)
U.S. National Championships (tennis)
U.S. National Championships (tennis)
U.S. National Championships (tennis)